Queen Anne Masonic Lodge is one of the oldest buildings on top of Queen Anne Hill in Seattle, Washington. The building was originally constructed to be the telephone exchange in the early 1900s, and is directly across the street from the Queen Anne Library. The building was bought in 1927 by Queen Anne Lodge #242 of the Grand Lodge of Washington, at which time the building received its present name, in honor of the branch of the fraternity it housed.

Today, it is still used by Queen Anne Lodge, and is open to the public as an event space.

References

External links
Queen Anne Lodge website

Buildings and structures in Seattle
Masonic buildings in Washington (state)